Finback may refer to:
 Alternate name for a Fin whale
 USS Finback the names of two US Navy submarines
 Finback (whaler)